East Wing West Wing TV is a political comedy show produced by Asia Television of Hong Kong through high-definition technology. It premiered on June 26, 2011 on ATV Home and ATV Asia. The show is based on a stage drama of the same name. Mathias Woo serves as the show's producer, director and screenwriter.

Broadcast
The following time to local time:

References

Related
Mathias Woo
Zuni Icosahedron
Asia Television

Link
Zuni Icosahedron
Asian television
ATV East Palace West Palace website
Editing East Wing West Wing facebook

Asia Television original programming